Aşk ve Mavi is a Turkish television series starring Burcu Kıratlı as Mavi and Emrah as Ali in lead roles. The show earned critical acclaim and was a major commercial success including winning several awards. The soundtracks of the drama were equally successful and popular. The show gained massive popularity and is regarded as one of the famous Turkish modern era drama in terms of its dialogues, plot twists, superb acting, cinematography and music. The show was originally broadcast on ATV between 2016 and 2018.

Plot
Ali (Emrah) is the son of a rich family and imprisoned in jail for killing a man named Ahmet. During his imprisonment, a girl named Mavi (Burcu Kıratlı) starts interacting with him through letters. Ali eventually falls in love with the girl whom he never saw but know only through letters. The day Ali was released the two decide to get married right away, but it is no coincidence that Mavi chooses Ali in so many people in prison to interact. Mavi is the sister of Ahmet, who was allegedly killed by Ali years ago & she seeks revenge against him. Mavi tries to kill Ali who she thinks is her brother's killer on their wedding night, although Ali is not his killer, he stayed in prison for 12 years to protect the real killer.

Luckily Ali was saved, his family came to know about Mavi reality sending her to jail. But Ali saves his wife staying by her side saying it was an accident. The family thinks Ali married and saved Mavi because of remorse. Otherside Mavi is all set to get the job done this time & took Ali & his family with Vengeance.

Cast

Awards

References

2010s Turkish television series
Turkish drama television series
Television series produced in Istanbul
Television shows set in Istanbul
Television series set in the 2010s